The 2015 season is Fylkir's 19th season in Úrvalsdeild and their 16th consecutive season in top-flight of Icelandic Football.

To start the season, Fylkir was coached by Ásmundur Arnarsson for the fourth consecutive season after he signed a new three-year contract on 9 October 2014. He was assisted by Reynir Leósson.

Along with the Úrvalsdeild, the club also competed in the Lengjubikarinn and Borgunarbikarinn.

On 6 July Ásmundur Arnarsson, following the 4–0 defeat against ÍBV, left the club by mutual consent. He was replaced with Hermann Hreiðarsson.

On 20 July Albert Brynjar Ingason became the club's all-time top scorer in the Úrvalsdeild scoring his 42nd goal in a 1–0 win against Breiðablik.

First Team

Transfers and loans

Transfers In

Transfers Out

Loans Out

Pre-season

Reykjavík Cup
Fylkir took part in the 2015 Reykjavík Cup, a pre-season tournament for clubs from Reykjavík.

The team played in group A along with Fjölnir, KR and Fram. Fylkir finished third in the group behind Fjölnir and KR with 1 point and did not go through to the semi-finals.

Lengjubikarinn
Fylkir were drawn in group 1 in the Icelandic league cup, Lengjubikarinn, along with FH, Breiðablik, ÍBV, Þróttur R, Víkingur Ó, BÍ/Bolungarvík and HK.

Fylkir finished top of the group with 16 points and went through to the quarter finals.

In the quarter finals Fylkir were defeated by KA 5–1 with Albert Brynjar scoring Fylkir's only goal.

Úrvalsdeild

League table

Results summary

Results by matchday

Matches

Borgunarbikarinn
Fylkir came into the Icelandic cup, Borgunarbikarinn, in the 32nd-finals and were drawn against Njarðvík. Fylkir won the game 3–2 after being 0–2 down until the 84th minute. The equalising goal and the winning goal both came in stoppage time.

In the 16th-finals the team was drawn against Stjarnan. Fylkir won the game 3–0.

On 4 July Fylkir lost to ÍBV in the quarter finals. After a tight first half ÍBV found the net on the 34th minute and took a 1–0 lead to the second half were they dominated Fylkir scoring three more goals.

Squad statistics

Appearances and goals

|-
|colspan="14"|Players who appeared for Fylkir but left during the season:

|}

Goal scorers

Disciplinary record

References

External links
 Fylkir Official Site

Fylkir